Bury Interchange is a transport hub in the town of Bury, Greater Manchester, England. Opened in 1980, it is the northern terminus of the Manchester Metrolink's Bury Line, which prior to 1992 was a heavy-rail line. It also incorporates a bus station.

History
Bury Interchange was opened by British Rail in March 1980, integrating a new bus station with the northern terminus of the Bury-to-Manchester heavy railway line, a new short spur line was constructed to connect the new station. The railway had originally run into Bury Bolton Street which was further away from the town centre, and was closed by British Rail on the same day that Bury Interchange opened; Bury Bolton Street is now operated by the heritage East Lancashire Railway. The railway was redeveloped in the early-1990s to become part of the Manchester Metrolink network in 1992, forming the northern terminus. The interchange is managed by Transport for Greater Manchester and has recently been refurbished, improving facilities and security for passengers.

Metrolink services

Service pattern 
Services mostly run every 12 minutes on 2 routes, forming a 6-minute service between Bury and Manchester at peak times.

Bus services
The majority of services are run by Go North West and Rosso with the remainder of services run by Arriva North West and Stagecoach Manchester. Now-defunct operators which have run services to or from the interchange in the past have included Ribble Motor Services, Crosville Motor Services, Yelloway Motor Services, Bee Line Buzz Company, Burnley & Pendle, Bolton Coachways, Mayne Coaches, Citibus Tours, Shearings, Blue Bus & Coach Services, Maytree Travel, JPT and First Greater Manchester.

There are frequent buses running to Manchester, Rochdale, Bolton, Middleton and Rawtenstall plus several parts of the Bury area including Heywood, Radcliffe, Ramsbottom and Tottington. Buses also run from Bury to Accrington, Bacup and Burnley.

Gallery

References

External links

Metrolink Stop Information
Bury Metrolink area map
Greater Manchester Passenger Transport Executive
TheTrams.co.uk: Metrolink, Bury
First Manchester
Easyride Buses

Bus stations in Greater Manchester
Tram stops in the Metropolitan Borough of Bury
Railway stations opened by British Rail
Railway stations in Great Britain opened in 1980
Railway stations in Great Britain closed in 1991
Railway stations in Great Britain opened in 1992
Tram stops on the Altrincham to Bury line
Tram stops on the Bury to Ashton-under-Lyne line
Buildings and structures in Bury, Greater Manchester